The Graves Hotel was a historic hotel located at 106 South Central Avenue in Harlowton, Montana. A. C. Graves, a leading figure in Harlowton's early development, had the hotel built in 1909; it was one of the first businesses to be built after a fire destroyed much of downtown Harlowton in 1907. The hotel was the first sandstone building in Harlowton, though the stone eventually became a common building material; its design featured a projecting corner oriel window topped by a metal cupola. In addition to hosting visitors and railroad travelers, the hotel also served as a community meeting place and business center.

The hotel was added to the National Register of Historic Places on August 6, 1980.

The hotel was destroyed by a fire on February 12, 2023.

References

Hotel buildings on the National Register of Historic Places in Montana
Hotels established in 1909
Hotel buildings completed in 1909
1909 establishments in Montana
National Register of Historic Places in Wheatland County, Montana
Sandstone buildings in the United States